Lim Kui-aon (born 14 July 1956) is a Taiwanese sailor. He competed in the 470 event at the 1984 Summer Olympics.

References

External links
 

1956 births
Living people
Taiwanese male sailors (sport)
Olympic sailors of Taiwan
Sailors at the 1984 Summer Olympics – 470
Place of birth missing (living people)